Mishap may refer to:

An accident
The Mishap, a 1960 Italian film
Mishap Creek, a stream in Alaska